Ludwig Blomstrand (born March 8, 1993) is a Swedish professional ice hockey player who currently plays for Södertälje SK in the HockeyAllsvenskan (Allsv). He made his Elitserien debut on September 27, 2011, against Brynäs IF. He was selected by the Vancouver Canucks in the 4th round, 120th overall, of the 2011 NHL Entry Draft.

After completing his entry-level contract within the Canucks affiliates, Blomstrand was not tendered a qualifying offer to remain with Vancouver. As a free agent, Blomstrand opted to return to his native Sweden, securing a two-year contract in a return with second division club, Almtuna IS of the Allsvenskan on May 12, 2016.

Career statistics

Regular season and playoffs

International

References

External links

1993 births
Almtuna IS players
Chicago Wolves players
Djurgårdens IF Hockey players
Kalamazoo Wings (ECHL) players
Living people
Sportspeople from Uppsala
Swedish ice hockey left wingers
Utica Comets players
Vancouver Canucks draft picks